Walburga Fricke  (born 14 September 1936) is a German politician, representative of the Christian Social Union of Bavaria. She is a member of the Landtag of Bavaria.

See also
List of Bavarian Christian Social Union politicians

References

Christian Social Union in Bavaria politicians
1936 births
Living people